Kuljit Singh Randhawa is an Indian politician and the MLA representing the Dera Bassi Assembly constituency in the Punjab Legislative Assembly. He is a member of the Aam Aadmi Party.  He was elected as the MLA in the 2022 Punjab Legislative Assembly election. He has been President of Truck Union of Derabassi for 16 years.

He has been chosen as Vice-President of ALL PUNJAB TRANSPORT UNION .

Member of Legislative Assembly
He represents the Dera Bassi Assembly constituency as MLA in Punjab Assembly. The Aam Aadmi Party gained a strong 79% majority in the sixteenth Punjab Legislative Assembly by winning 92 out of 117 seats in the 2022 Punjab Legislative Assembly election. MP Bhagwant Mann was sworn in as Chief Minister on 16 March 2022.

Committee assignments of Punjab Legislative Assembly
Member (2022–23) Committee on Local Bodies 
Member (2022–23) Committee on Panchayati Raj Institutions

Electoral performance

References

External links

Living people
Punjab, India MLAs 2022–2027
Aam Aadmi Party politicians from Punjab, India
Year of birth missing (living people)